The Graduate School of Medicine and Faculty of Medicine, University of Tokyo are a single, merged department at the University of Tokyo.  The Faculty of Medicine (東京大学医学部) is one of the 10 constituent faculties, and the Graduate School of Medicine (東京大学大学院医学系研究科) is one of the 15 constituent graduate schools at University of Tokyo. The Faculty of Medicine was founded in 1877 and is one of the four oldest faculties (along with the Faculties of Science, Medicine, Law, and Letters) at the University of Tokyo.

Degree Programs

Faculty of Medicine (Undergraduate Courses) 

 School of Medicine (6-year medical degree program)
 School of Integrated Health Sciences (4-year bachelor's degree program)

Graduate School of Medicine (Graduate Courses) 
The following programs are not medical degrees.

 PhD MD course
 Master's Program
 Health Sciences and Nursing
 International Health / Global Health Sciences
 Medical Science
 Molecular Cell Biology
 Functional Biology
 Pathology, Immunology and Microbiology
 Radiology and Biomedical Engineering
 Neuroscience
 Social Medicine
 Center for Disease Biology and Integrative Medicine
 Master’s Program (Public Health Nursing Course / Nursing Course)
 Professional Degree Course
 School of Public Health
 Doctoral Program
 Health Sciences and Nursing
 Health Sciences and Nursing
 Doctoral Program in Medicine

External links 

 Graduate School of Medicine and Faculty of Medicine, The University of Tokyo

University of Tokyo
Tokyo, University of